USS H-7 (SS-150) was a H-class submarine originally built for the Imperial Russian Navy. Six of these were not delivered pending the outcome of the Russian Revolution of 1917 before being purchased by the United States Navy on 20 May 1918.

Description
They displaced  on the surface and  submerged. The boats had a crew of 2 officers and 23 enlisted men.

For surface running, they were powered by two New London Ship & Engine Co.  diesel engines, each driving one propeller shaft. When submerged each propeller was driven by a  Electro Dynamic Co. electric motor. They could reach  on the surface and  underwater.

The boats were armed with four 18-inch (450 mm)  torpedo tubes in the bow. They carried four reloads, for a total of eight torpedoes.

Construction and career
H-7 was launched on 17 October 1918 and commissioned on 24 October. The submarine, attached to Submarine Division 6 (SubDiv 6) and later to SubDiv 7, operated out of San Pedro, California, on various battle and training exercises with the other ships of her division. She also patrolled out of San Pedro with interruptions for overhaul at Mare Island. H-7 reached Norfolk on 14 September 1922, having sailed from San Pedro on 25 July, and decommissioned there on 23 October. Her name was struck from the Naval Vessel Register on 26 February 1931. She was sold for scrapping on 28 November 1933.

Notes

References

External links

United States H-class submarines
World War I submarines of the United States
Ships built in Bremerton, Washington
1918 ships
Russian Empire–United States relations